Edgar Maurice Cortright (July 29, 1923 – May 4, 2014) was a scientist and engineer, and senior official at the National Aeronautics and Space Administration (NASA) in the United States. His most prominent positions during his career were Director of NASA's Langley Research Center, and Chairman of the Apollo 13 Review Board which investigated the explosion that occurred during the Apollo 13 spaceflight in 1970.

Education
Cortright was born on July 29, 1923 in Hastings, Pennsylvania, a coal mining district in the west of the state. His family moved to the Philadelphia area where he attended high school. He earned a B.S. followed by an M.S. in aeronautical engineering at Rensselaer Polytechnic Institute in 1947 and 1949.  At RPI, he was roommates with George Low (who would go on to become NASA Administrator, and later President of RPI). He attended the National Advisory Committee for Aeronautics (NACA) Nuclear Engineering School in 1957.  Much later, in 1975, he got a Doctor of Engineering degree from Rensselaer (this was during the time while he was Director at NASA Langley).  Cortright gained membership to the Stephen Van Rensselaer Society of Patroons, people who have donate $1 million or more to Rensselaer.

Family
His parents were Janet Pearsall Cortright and Edgar Maurice Cortright Sr. He had a sister, Janet, who died before him, and a brother, David. He married Beverly Jane Hotaling in 1945 and she died in 2012. Their children were Susan and David, and Cortright had three grandsons at the time of his death.

Career

Cortright enlisted in the United States Navy in September 1941 where he was a Lieutenant. He went on to work at the Lewis Flight Propulsion Laboratory (now the Glenn Research Center) at NACA, in Cleveland, Ohio. There, he held the positions of Aeronautical Research Scientist (1948); Head of Small Supersonic Tunnels Section (1949–1954); and Chief, Eight-by-Six-Foot Supersonic Wind Tunnel Branch (1954–1958).

NASA
He joined the newly formed NASA agency (successor to the NACA) as a founding member in 1958 and worked at NASA Headquarters in Washington D.C. where he was Chief of Advanced Technology (1958–1959); Assistant Director for Lunar and Planetary Programs, Office of Space Flight Programs, (1960–61); Deputy Director for Space Science and Applications (1961–1963); Deputy Associate Administrator for Space Science and Applications (1963–1968); and Deputy Associate Administrator, Office of Manned Space Flight, (1968).

He was awarded the NASA Distinguished Service Medal in October 1967.

He was Director of the Langley Research Center in Hampton, Virginia from 1968–1975. Following the spacecraft explosion during the Apollo 13 spaceflight in April 1970, Cortright was appointed chairman of the Apollo 13 Review Board which was established to investigate the cause of the accident. The Board reported its findings to NASA in June 1970.

After NASA

Cortright left NASA to become Corporate Vice President and Technical Director at Owens Illinois Corporation from 1975–1979. He also held the positions of Senior Vice President for Science and Engineering (1978) and President (1979–1983) at Lockheed-California Company in Los Angeles, California.

He died from a stroke in Palm City, Florida, on May 4, 2014, aged 90.

References

External links
 NASA Biographical Data Sheet: Edgar Maurice Cortright
 Oral History Transcript: Edgar M. Cortright Lengthy interview of Cortright.
 Spaceflight Revolution: NASA Langley Research Center From Sputnik to Apollo See Chapter 12: The Cortright Synthesis.
 Exploring Space With A Camera. Compiled and Edited by Edgar M. Cortright, 1968.
 Apollo Expeditions to the Moon Edited by Edgar M. Cortright, 1975.

People from Cambria County, Pennsylvania
Rensselaer Polytechnic Institute alumni
Center Directors of NASA
Langley Research Center
1923 births
2014 deaths
People from Palm City, Florida